Basil Christensen (9 June 1938 – 13 May 2005) was a British field hockey player. He competed in the men's tournament at the 1968 Summer Olympics.

References

External links
 

1938 births
2005 deaths
British male field hockey players
Olympic field hockey players of Great Britain
Field hockey players at the 1968 Summer Olympics